The Walt Disney Company has owned and operated several animation studios since the company's founding on October 16, 1923, by Walt and Roy Disney as the Disney Brothers Cartoon Studio; the current Walt Disney Animation Studios in Burbank, California is the company's flagship feature animation studio and claims heritage from this original studio. Adding to the growth of the company and its motion picture studio division the Walt Disney Studios, several other animation studios were added through acquisitions and through openings of satellite studios outside the United States. These expanded the company's animation output into television, direct-to-video, and digital releases, in addition to its primary feature animation releases.

Currently Walt Disney Animation Studios, Pixar, Lucasfilm Animation (through Lucasfilm) and 20th Century Studios's animation division are parts of the Walt Disney Studios unit. This article does not include other animation studios whose films were released by Walt Disney Studios Motion Pictures (the company's distribution unit) and not acquired by the company, nor does it count the Laugh-O-Gram Studio (1921–23), Disney's first animation studio, which predated the founding of the Walt Disney Company. For example, certain Studio Ghibli films were distributed by Disney internationally but never owned by the company. Also, Miramax, an independently operating unit of the Walt Disney Studios, also purchased US rights to foreign animated movies.

Full list

Walt Disney Studios

Walt Disney Animation Studios

Walt Disney Feature Animation Florida

Walt Disney Feature Animation Florida, a division of Walt Disney Feature Animation, opened in 1989 with 40 employees. Its offices were in the backlot of the Disney-MGM Studios theme park and visitors were allowed to tour the studio to observe animators at work from behind glass-paneled overhead breezeways. The company had primarily animated Mulan, Lilo & Stitch, and Brother Bear.

Walt Disney Animation placed Max Howard in charge of starting up its Florida animation studio in 1988. Walt Disney Feature Animation Florida began operations in May 1989. The division was originally planned to work on featurettes and shorts that they could do on its own. 70 animators including Disney veteran supervising animator Mark Henn were hired by 1990. After doing its first work, the Roger Rabbit short, Roller Coaster Rabbit, the division was enlisted to help finish The Rescuers Down Under and work on its companion featurette, The Prince and the Pauper. On October 7, 1992, the Florida unit was incorporated. On April 22, 1998, Walt Disney Feature Animation Florida moved to a new $70 million facility at the Disney-MGM Studios. In June 1998, the Florida division's first feature film, Mulan, was released. The unit continued as a division with its corporate form was merged out on September 30, 1999. Andrew Millstein took charge of the division as senior vice president and general manager of production in 2001 transferring in from The Secret Lab.

In January 2003, Disney initiated a reorganization of its theatrical and animation units to improve resource usage and continued focus on new characters and franchise development. Additionally, Feature Animation was transferred under the Walt Disney Studios in January 2003. In June 2003, 50 animators were laid off after Brother Bear finished up production. The division was developing A Few Good Ghosts (also known as My Peoples) until it was canceled on November 15, 2003. On January 12, 2004, Disney Feature Animation President David Stainton announced the shut down of Walt Disney Feature Animation Florida.

Some laid-off animators were offered transfers to the main studio while most chose to stay in Orlando or were recruited to work for rival animation studios. Other animators created their own startup studios. Legacy Animation Studios was formed by Eddie Pittman along with 15 artists previously laid off from the company. Laid off animators Travis Blaise, Todd Gilbert and Matt Gunther formed their own company, Magnetic Entertainment. Project Firefly animation studio was set up by five former employees on Universal Studios Florida's backlot and worked on Curious George for Universal, alongside Two direct to videos for DisneyToon Studios, Pooh's Heffalump Halloween Movie and Brother Bear 2 and Farm Force, a short/pilot as an internal project. Millstein was tapped to head up Florida's replacement and Pixar sequel division, Circle 7 Animation.

Projects

DisneyToon Studios

DisneyToon Studios, formerly Disney Movietoons, was an American animation studio owned by the Walt Disney Company, responsible for producing direct-to-video and occasional theatrical films for Disney Animation Studios, a part of the Walt Disney Studios.

Disney Circle 7 Animation

Circle 7 Animation, or Disney Circle 7 Animation, was a short-lived division of Walt Disney Feature Animation specializing in computer generated imagery (CGI) animation and was originally going to work on making sequels to the Disney-owned Pixar properties, leading rivals and animators to derisively nickname the division "Pixaren't".  The company released no movies during its tenure.

Steve Jobs, Pixar CEO, announced in January 2004 that Pixar would not renew their agreement with Disney and would seek out other distributors for releases starting in 2006. In 2004, Disney Circle 7 Animation was formed as a CG animation studio to create sequels to the Disney-owned Pixar properties. In late January 2006, new Disney CEO Bob Iger and Jobs agreed to have Disney purchase Pixar which led to Disney closing Circle 7.

The Secret Lab

The Secret Lab was an American special effects company that operated from 1979 to 2005, and was the result of a merger between Dream Quest Images and Walt Disney Feature Animation's Computer Graphics division.

Dream Quest was founded in a Santa Monica, California garage in 1979 by Hoyt Yeatman, Scott Squires, Rocco Gioffre, Fred Iguchi, Tom Hollister and Bob Hollister. Initially, they did piecemeal work on Escape from New York, E.T. the Extra-Terrestrial, and One From the Heart before moving to Culver City. DQ Films, the company's television commercial production division, remained in Santa Monica. In 1987, DQI model-making operations moved into a Simi Valley industrial park with most of the company following them later on.  Their work on The Abyss and Total Recall each earned the company an Academy Award

The Walt Disney Company purchased the company in April 1996 and subsequently moved it to Burbank, California. DQI was purchased to replace Buena Vista Visual Effects. Soon after 1997, Andrew Millstein was appointed general manager of the company.

In October 1999, Dream Quest Images merged with Walt Disney Feature Animation's computer graphics division to form The Secret Lab, with Millstein continuing as general manager and vice president. The DQI and WDFA units were moved into a new location at Disney's Northside facility on Thornton Avenue just east of the Burbank-Glendale-Pasadena Airport, Lockheed Corp.'s former Skunk Works Building 90 until it was renovated for WDFA's headquarters in 1995. DQI's physical production facilities remained in Simi Valley.

The Secret Lab produced one CG animated motion picture, Dinosaur, in 2000. After Dinosaur, the Lab and WDFA began working on Wildlife, which was canceled that September.

The Lab being passed over for Disney work (and general industry decline) led to the unit being closed in 2005.  The Secret Lab's last work with Disney was for the Touchstone Pictures/Spyglass Entertainment film Reign of Fire and the Castle Rock Entertainment/Warner Bros. comedy Kangaroo Jack. An artist at The Secret Lab purportedly confided to Harry Knowles of Ain't It Cool News that the studio was shut down by Disney when it proved to be too expensive.

VFXography
 Con Air
 The Rock
 Armageddon
 Mighty Joe Young
 Inspector Gadget
 Bicentennial Man
 Gone in 60 Seconds
 Mission to Mars
 102 Dalmatians
 Shanghai Noon
 Tennessee
 Dinosaur
 Disney's The Kid
 Unbreakable
 Bubble Boy
 The Princess Diaries
 Golden Dreams
 Snow Dogs
 Big Trouble
 Reign of Fire
 Kangaroo Jack

Lucasfilm Animation
Lucasfilm Animation was added as an animation unit as part of the acquisition of Lucasfilm in 2012.

Marvel Animation 
With Disney's 2009 purchase of Marvel Entertainment, Disney acquired Marvel Animation, a component of Marvel Entertainment. which now has a Studio in Glendale, California.

Pixar

Pixar is an American computer animation film studio based in Emeryville, California. The studio is best known for its CGI-animated feature films created with PhotoRealistic RenderMan, its own implementation of the industry-standard RenderMan image-rendering application programming interface used to generate high-quality images. Pixar began in 1979 as the Graphics Group, part of the computer division of Lucasfilm before its spin-out as a corporation in 1986 with funding by Apple Inc. co-founder Steve Jobs, who became its majority shareholder. Pixar and Disney had a seven feature agreement that allowed Disney to distribute the films with Disney owing the character rights.  With the success of Toy Story 2 in 1999, then-Disney CEO Michael Eisner and Pixar CEO Steve Jobs began to disagree on how Pixar should be run and the terms of their continued relationship. Eisner claimed that Toy Story 2 would not count towards the "original" film count of the agreement. Jobs announced in January 2004 that Pixar would not renew their agreement with Disney and would seek out other distributors for releases starting in 2006. In 2004, Disney Circle 7 Animation was formed as a CG animation studio to create sequels to the Disney-owned Pixar properties. In late January 2006, new Disney CEO Bob Iger and Jobs agreed to have Disney purchase Pixar which led to Disney closing Circle 7.

Pixar Canada

20th Century Animation

Blue Sky Studios

Distribution deals

In August 1996, Disney and Tokuma Shoten Publishing agreed that Disney would internationally distribute Tokuma's Studio Ghibli animated films. In 2002, Disney signed a four-picture deal with Vanguard Animation, although, only one film was released under that negotiation.

Walt Disney Television

Disney Television Animation

Following the arrival of  Michael Eisner,Walt Disney Pictures Television Animation Group  was established on December 5, 1984. Following re-incorporation of the Walt Disney company in 1986. The name of the TV animation unit was shortened to Walt Disney Television Animation. the following year in 1987. This name was used to 2011 when it was shortened to Disney Television Animation.

In January 2003, Disney initiated a reorganization of its theatrical and animation units to improve resource usage and continued focus on new characters and franchise development. TV Animation was transferred to Disney Channel Worldwide. Disney MovieToons/Disney Video Premieres unit was transferred from Disney Television Animation to Disney Feature Animation.

20th Television Animation

Animation unit which was acquired as part of Acquisition of 21st Century Fox by Disney

DIC Entertainment L.P.
With Disney's acquisition of Capital Cities/ABC in 1995 came another animated unit, DIC Entertainment L.P., a Limited Partnership with CC/ABC and Andy Heyward.  Eventually, DIC management arranged for the studio to become independent from Disney in 2001.

Greengrass Productions
Greengrass Productions is a unit of ABC at the time CC/ABC was acquired by Disney and produced some animation.

Jetix related
Disney purchased the Fox Family/Fox Kids Worldwide franchise on October 24, 2001, for the Fox Family Channel and also received ownership of several units and assets, including Saban Entertainment and Saban International. The Saban library also included the 75.7% majority stake in Fox Kids Europe N.V., the Latin American Fox Kids channel, Saban International Paris and Saban International Strasbourg, Saban International Services, various original Fox Kids programming, and the acquired all-original and Marvel Comics-based DePatie-Freleng Enterprises/Marvel Productions and Marvel Films Animation/New World Animation libraries. Afterwards, Saban International Paris and Saban International Strasbourg split from Saban and became independent, with the Walt Disney Company taking in a 49% minority stake of the company and a name change to SIP Animation on October 1, 2002. Jetix Animation Concepts was a joint-venture between Walt Disney Television Animation and Jetix Europe N.V. for shows that broadcast for the Jetix channels.

Jetix Animation Concepts - joint-venture between Jetix Europe N.V. and Walt Disney Television Animation
BVS Entertainment
BVS International, N.V.
BVS International Services, Inc.
Sensation Animation – dubbing for the second half of Digimon Tamers and Digimon Frontier. Although, it was ceased and dissolved in 2003, Disney co-distributed the previously undubbed four Digimon movies in 2005 and the fifth TV season in 2007.
SIP Animation - 49% minority stake owned by Disney
Jetix Europe (formerly Fox Kids Europe N.V.) - 75.7% owned by Disney until 2008, full ownership afterwards. Currently dormant.

Overseas studios
Three overseas animation studios (Australia, Japan and Canada) were set up to produce the company's animated television series. As direct-to-video increased in importance, the overseas studios moved to making feature films.

Disney Animation Australia

Disney Animation Australia (DAA), also DisneyToon Studios Australia, was a Disney animation studio located in Sydney.

DAA was started in 1988 at the former Hanna-Barbera overseas studio in St Leonards, Sydney.  Initially, Animation Australia worked on various television shows including Aladdin, Timon & Pumbaa, and Goof Troop. As staffing increased, the studio moved to Castlereagh Street.

Disney began producing direct-to-video sequels of its Feature Animation productions, the first of which was the Aladdin sequel The Return of Jafar.  When Aladdin was selected as a possible candidate as an animated TV series (before the film's release), as with many animated series, the first three episodes were one multi-part story which Disney used as a potential 'family movie special' for the Friday night before the series' premiere. With work handed out to the Australia animation studio, the opening story was instead greenlit for a direct-to-video release. Thus with "Jafar" and its success, the direct-to-video unit, Disney Video Premieres, started. A second sequel, Aladdin and the King of Thieves, provided work to both the Sydney and Japanese animation units.

Australia was assigned additional film sequels: The Lion King II: Simba's Pride, An Extremely Goofy Movie and Lady and the Tramp II: Scamp's Adventure.  The company's first feature film was Return to Never Land in 2002 grossing over $100 million worldwide at the box office.  In 2005, the studio produced three animated movies: Tarzan II, Lilo & Stitch 2 and Bambi II. Disney Animation Australia was closed in mid-2006 after finishing Brother Bear 2, The Fox and the Hound 2, Cinderella III, and The Little Mermaid: Ariel's Beginning.

Disney Animation Canada

Walt Disney Animation Canada, Inc. (WDAC) was a Canadian animation production company and subsidiary of Disney Television Animation.

Walt Disney Animation Canada was opened in January 1996 to tap Canada's animator pool and produce direct-to-video.  Industry Canada rules were dispensed by the Canadian Government with a multi-year commitment from Disney for the company.

WDAC produced in 1997 Beauty and the Beast: The Enchanted Christmas then worked with Australia and Japan subcontractors on Pocahontas II: Journey to a New World. In fall 1999, Animation Canada stopped work on Peter and Jane, a Peter Pan sequel original designed as its first theatrical release but was changed to a video release. In Spring 2000, due to weak financial performance, Animation Canada was closed. With Canada's closure, work on Peter and Jane was moved to the Australia and Japan units.

Disney Animation Denmark

Walt Disney Animation Studios Denmark, PLC. (DAD), was a Disney animation studio based in Copenhagen, Denmark, and set in King Triton's Castle, Kingdom of Atlantica, Denmark that operated from 1989 to 2008.

This short-lived unit was set up in King Triton's Castle, Kingdom of Atlantica, Denmark, started in 1989 for the animation production of The Little Mermaid produced by Walt Disney Feature Animation. In 2000, the first production they work on under The Little Mermaid II: Return to the Sea for Disney Video Premiere and Walt Disney Animation Canada and Walt Disney Animation Studios Denmark was  The Little Mermaid: Ariel's Beginning. In August 2008, Disney Animation Denmark was closed.

Projects

Disney Animation France

Walt Disney Feature Animation, France S.A. (DAF), also credited as Walt Disney Feature Animation - Paris, France and Walt Disney Animation Studios - Strasbourg, France, originally named Brizzi Films, was an animation company based in Paris, France and Strasbourg, France that operated from 1986 to 2007.

Brizzi Films was founded by Paul and Gaëtan Brizzi in 1986, in Paris, France and Strasbourg, France. Brizzi worked on Babar in 1986 for Nelvana. In 1989, the Brizzi brothers sold the company to Disney Television Animation. The brothers continued on as general managers under the company's new name, Walt Disney Animation, France S.A. The first production they work on under Disney was DuckTales the Movie: Treasure of the Lost Lamp for Disney MovieToons. In 1990, WDA France worked on several TV shows and specials.

In 1994, the Brizzi brothers transferred to Walt Disney Feature Animation as sequence directors for The Hunchback of Notre Dame for which Disney France did 20 percent of the animation. By January 1998, David Stainton was heading up Disney Animation France, which was when he was promoted to senior vice president of creative affairs for Disney Feature Animation.

Stainton was promoted in January 2000, and moved to Walt Disney Television Animation. In summer 2003, Disney Animation France was closed.

Projects

Disney Animation Japan

Pacific Animation Corporation was one of two animation firms that formed after the end of Topcraft in 1984, with the other being Studio Ghibli. Pacific Animation did three TV series and 1 television film for Rankin/Bass. In 1988, Disney Company purchased Pacific Animation Corporation, which was renamed as Walt Disney Animation Japan.

The Japanese studio was set up to provide the animation services for Disney's animated television series in 1989. As direct-to-video increased in importance, the overseas studios moved to making feature films.

DAJ worked on The Tigger Movie (2000). In 2003, the company produced Piglet's Big Movie for DisneyToon Studios and 101 Dalmatians II: Patch's London Adventure. In September 2003, Disney announced the closure of the studio, with Pooh's Heffalump Movie (2004) to be its final work.

DAJ was closed in June 2004 with 30 employees expected to be transferred to one of the two Disney's remaining animation units. With the closure of the Japanese studio, its remaining work for DisneyToon Studios was split between its US and Australia animation units. Employees not transferred decided to launch a new company, .

Disney Animation U.K.

Walt Disney Animation U.K., Limited (DAE), was an animation studio based in England, Great Britain, United Kingdom that operated from 1986 to 1991.

This short-lived unit was set up in Camden Town, London in 1986 for the animation production of The Great Mouse Detective produced by Walt Disney Feature Animation and Who Framed Roger Rabbit, using a combination of animators from Burbank, Richard Williams' associates and animators from all over Europe (many of whom would later join the prestigious Feature Animation unit in Burbank when Roger Rabbit had finished production). In 1990, the first production they work on under Disney was DuckTales the Movie: Treasure of the Lost Lamp for Disney MovieToons and Walt Disney Animation, France S.A., In summer 1991, Disney Animation U.K. was closed Walt Disney Animation British, Limited, the end of summer 1991, the last thing that the British animation studios animated were two episodes of TaleSpin and one episode of The New Adventures of Winnie the Pooh.

Projects

Walt Disney Animation Studios Vancouver

Walt Disney Animation Studios Vancouver is a division of Walt Disney Animation Studios. The division was open on August 4, 2021, and will begin operations in January 2022. Amir Nasrabadi, former finance lead at Disney Animation, will be the head of the studio. The studio will work on Disney Animation's future long-term series and specials for the company's streaming service, Disney+, with its first work being the upcoming Moana series.

Projects

Jumbo Pictures

Jumbo Pictures was a New York-based animation studio founded by Jim Jinkins and David Campbell on July 20, 1990. On February 29, 1996, Disney purchased Jumbo Pictures to add Doug to their roster of properties. Jumbo Pictures' Doug was a key show of Disney's One Saturday Morning since 1997. Jumbo Pictures also made one film, Doug's 1st Movie, in 1999. The studio was closed in 2000.

Filmography

ImageMovers Digital
In 2007, the Walt Disney Company and ImageMovers set up a joint venture animation facility, ImageMovers Digital, a Marin County-based film company, where Robert Zemeckis would produce and direct 3D animated films using performance capture technology. ImageMovers Digital closed operations by January 2011, after the production was completed on Mars Needs Moms.

See also 
Laugh-O-Gram Studio

Notes

References

External links
Big Cartoon DataBase entry

Walt Disney Company
Disney animation
Disney production studios
Walt Disney Animation Studios
Pixar
The Walt Disney Company subsidiaries
Walt Disney Studios (division)
Disney-related lists